Halvey is an Irish surname. Notable people with the surname include:

Eddie Halvey (born 1970), Irish rugby union player
Marie Halvey (1895–1967), American film editor

See also
Haley (surname)
Halley (surname)
Harvey (name)
Havey

Anglicised Irish-language surnames